Bearwood may refer to:

Bearwood House, a country house in Berkshire, England
Reddam House, Berkshire formerly known as Bearwood College, an independent school located in Bearwood House in Berkshire, England
Bearwood, Dorset, a suburb of Poole, England
Bearwood and Lower Bearwood, hamlets in the civil parish of Pembridge in Herefordshire, England
Bearwood, West Midlands, England